Albert Fahmy Tadros (8 August 1914 – 4 April 1993) was an Egyptian basketball player. He competed in the men's tournament at the 1936, 1948 and the 1952 Summer Olympics. He also participated in the Egypt men's national basketball team, winning EuroBasket 1949 and coming third in EuroBasket 1947.

References

External links
 

1914 births
1993 deaths
Egyptian men's basketball players
Olympic basketball players of Egypt
Basketball players at the 1936 Summer Olympics
Basketball players at the 1948 Summer Olympics
Basketball players at the 1952 Summer Olympics
Place of birth missing
1950 FIBA World Championship players